Thomas Jefferson Eppes was a cotton planter and politician who served as president of the Florida Senate in 1860 and 1861.

He was the son of Francis Eppes and the great-grandson of Thomas Jefferson.

In 1859, he wrote to governor Madison S. Perry from Appalachicola recommending Reuben L. Harrison for the position of cotton weigher.

He had a son, T. J. Eppes, who murdered a man and was put on trial in 1884. The younger Eppes married Kate E. Eppes who died July 25, 1886 at 22 years of age.

References

Florida state senators
Members of the Florida House of Representatives